Labytnangi (lit. seven larches; Nenets: Лабытнаӈгы. Population:

History
It was established in 1890. It was granted urban-type settlement status in 1952 and town status in 1975.

Labytnangi is connected to the European Russia by a branch of the Konosha-Vorkuta railway. It is the terminus station on this short stub branch; however, it was built in the early 1950s by Gulag inmates as the first stage of  a large project under which the railway would have crossed the north of Tyumen Oblast and reached Igarka on the Yenisei River. The project was abandoned after Joseph Stalin's death.

Administrative and municipal status
Within the framework of administrative divisions, it is incorporated as the town of okrug significance of Labytnangi—an administrative unit with the status equal to that of the districts. As a municipal division, the town of okrug significance of Labytnangi is incorporated as Labytnangi Urban Okrug.

References

Notes

Sources

External links
 Official website of Labytnangi
Official website of Yamalo-Nenets Autonomous Okrug. Information about Labytnangi

 
Populated places of Arctic Russia
Road-inaccessible communities of Russia
Populated places on the Ob River